Moschops is a British stop motion-animated children's television series produced by FilmFair, and broadcast on ITV in 1983.

The characters in Moschops are designed by Sue Marke. All of the cast are prehistoric animals, except for Flower, who is the world's first flower.

The characters' names imply their species or genus. The title character, Moschops, is a young therapsid of the genus Moschops; Ally is a theropod of the genus Allosaurus; Grandfather Diplodocus is a sauropod of the genus Diplodocus; Mrs. Kerry is a ceratopsid of the genus Triceratops; Uncle Rex is a Tyrannosaurus rex; and Mr. Ichthyosaurus is an ichthyosaur of the genus Ichthyosaurus.

In the series, Moschops and Ally are friends. They live in a cave with Grandfather Diplodocus and Uncle Rex.

From 1984 to 1985, Omroepvereniging VARA, the Dutch public broadcasting network, broadcast a Dutch-dubbed version titled Knobbel. Channel 4 retransmitted Moschops in 1988. The series was also broadcast in Canada on the Knowledge Network & TVOntario and New Zealand on Channel 2.

Episode list

Video releases

Moschops in print
For a short time after the series aired, Pippin featured a Moschops comic strip.

Purnell Publishers of Bristol published eight small picture books based on the television programme: Moschops and the Fierceness Lesson (1983), Moschops and the Mystery (1983), Moschops and the Surprise (1983), Moschops Digs a Hole (1983), Moschops and the Sneezes (1983), Moschops Plays Football (1983), Moschops' Kite (1984), and Moschops' Birthday (1984).

Other Moschops books include Moschops Annual (1983), Moschops Playtime Book (1983), and Moschops Dot-to-Dot (1984).

Notes

References
 
. Retrieved 5 January 2013.
. Retrieved 5 January 2013.

External links

Moschops at Jedi's Paradise. Retrieved 5 January 2013.

1983 British television series debuts
1983 British television series endings
1980s British children's television series
British children's animated television shows
ITV children's television shows
English-language television shows
British stop-motion animated television series
Television series by FilmFair
Television series by DHX Media
1980s British animated television series